is a 1999 Japanese Transformers television animated series, a toy line, and a sequel to Beast Wars II. It was produced by NAS, TV Tokyo, and Ashi Productions. Hozumi Gōda reprised his role as Lio Convoy from Beast Wars II whenever he appeared in the series. Each episode runs for about 30 minutes and were broadcast in standard 4:3 aspect ratio.

Plot
The series focuses on a battle between Maximal and Predacon factions for possession of mysterious Angolmois Capsules. The lone "one-man army" Big Convoy is assigned the task of being a teacher to a group of young recruits against Magmatron's group. By the end of the series, however, both forces unite to oppose the wrath of the dark god Unicron and his sub-group, the Blentrons.

Characters

This is a list of characters from the 1999 anime series Super Life-Form Transformers: Beast Wars Neo. A direct sequel to the series Beast Wars II, Beast Wars Neo sees a group of young Maximals led by Big Convoy traversing the galaxy to stop Magmatron's Predacons and Unicron's Blentrons from collecting a series of capsules containing Angolmois Energy.

Maximals
 Big Convoy - Big Convoy is a Convoy warrior with a reputation for being a "one-man-army" due to his astounding power and tendency for heading into battle alone. Against his wishes, he is assigned by the planet Cybertron's supercomputer Vector Sigma and the Convoy Council to lead a group of young Maximals on a mission to retrieve the Angolmois Capsules, which Lio Convoy scattered across the galaxy to stop Galvatron at the end of Beast Wars II, before Magmatron and later Unicron. Big Convoy can transform into a woolly mammoth and wields the Big Cannon.

 Longrack - Longrack is the aggressively strict and gabby sub-commander of the group who can transform into a giraffe and specializes in tinkering with machines. In battle, he can perform the Arm Shot and Crush Arm attacks.

 Colada - Colada is a cold, quick-tempered, and arrogant Maximal who can transform into a cobra and possesses transformative powers that cause him to favor dry climates.

 Stampy - Stampy is a cheery yet cowardly Maximal triple-changer known for frustrating his teammates who can transform into a domestic white rabbit and a pair of scissors. Additionally, he possesses enhanced hearing, speed, and intelligence-gathering capabilities.

 Break - Break is a bold, anger-prone, and tidy Maximal who can transform into a penguin, specializes in cold environments, cares deeply for his teammates, and can launch the destructive Break Anchors from his right arm.

 Heinrad - Heinrad is an easy-going and sociable yet mischievous and unmotivated Maximal who can transform into a tanuki and possesses a clock on his body that allows him to freeze time for 30 seconds before his energy is drained.

 Mach Kick - Mach Kick is a rowdy and free-spirited Maximal and the former second-in-command of the Thoroughbred Corps who can transform into a black horse and possesses copious battlefield experience. After losing his original team to the Predacons, Mach Kick joins Big Convoy, whom he idolizes, and seeks to please him despite clashing with his friend Longrack. In battle, Mach Kick can perform the Elastic Hand attack and wields the Tail Tomahawk.

 Navi - Navi is the Maximals' navigational computer.

 Rockbuster - Rockbuster is an efficient and pragmatic Maximal vigilante who can transform into a crab and originally worked alongside Big Convoy before they had a falling out due to their shared solitary nature, with Rockbuster working independently of the Convoy Council. In battle, Rockbuster possesses a durable shell that grants enhanced endurance and wields the Claw Buster and Crush Claw weapons. He is a redeco of Razorclaw from Beast Wars I.

 Randy - Randy is a dedicated, patient, and honest yet reckless, overly serious, and single-minded Maximal soldier-for-hire who can transform into a wild boar and wields the Charge Buster. He is a redeco of Razorbeast from Beast Wars I.

 Sharp Edge - Sharp Edge is a dedicated and honorable yet unpredictable Maximal soldier who can transform into a sawshark, prides himself on his combat capability, and wields the Diamondtail blade. He is a retool of the original Cybershark from Beast Wars I.

 Bump - Bump is a reserved and solitary Maximal who can transform into an armadillo, possesses enhanced strength, shell-like skin, and a lightning fast draw-and-fire technique. He is a redeco of Armordillo from Beast Wars I.

 Survive - Survive is a Maximal assault commander who can transform into a grayish bear and possesses a bat-like reconnaissance scout called True One. He disagrees with Big Convoy's solitary attitude and desires to make him more willing to work with a team. Survive is a redeco of the mold used for Beast Wars I's Polar Claw and the prototype for Grizzly-1.

Predacons
 Magmatron - Magmatron is the leader of a faction of Predacons who refers to himself as the "Emperor of Destruction", seeks the Angolmois Capsules to exterminate all life in the universe. Additionally, he is capable of splitting into the Giganotosaurus-esque Landsaurus, the Quetzalcoatlus-esque Skysaurus, and the Elasmosaurus-esque Seasaurus and recombine into the chimeric Magmasaurus. After the Blentrons' goal of resurrecting Unicron threaten his plans, Magmatron attempts to destroy him, at the cost of his crew's loyalty. His figure was later recycled for the Dinobots' part of the Beast Machines toyline.

 Guiledart - Guiledart is Magmatron's ambitious right hand and tactician who serves as a supporter of reason and engineer. He can transform into a Triceratops, perform the Thunder Horn Blast attack, and wields the Tail Shooter gun.

 Saberback - Saberback is a mysterious, crafty, and dishonest Predacon who enjoys tormenting Sling. He can transform into a Stegosaurus and wields the Triple Claw talons, which can fire lasers when fully powered. 

 Sling - Sling is a cowardly and immature Predacon who complains when the other Predacons belittle him. He can transform into a Dimetrodon, disguise himself as a flower, and wields the Tail Bunker and Sling Shield.

 Dead End - Dead End is a cool-headed, solitary, and cruel Predacon soldier who can transform into an ammonite. In battle, he can perform the Spiral Bomb attack and wields the Dead Gun.

 Archadis - Archadis is a cunning yet vain, talkative, and snobbish Predacon who can transform into an Archaeopteryx. In battle, he wields the Wing Gundreads fully automatic cannons, Wing Bombs, and the Founder Shot.

 DNAVI - DNAVI is the Predacons' dragonfly-shaped navigational computer.

 Killerpunch - Killerpunch is a sneaky and deceitful yet gullible Predacon intelligence operative obsessed with laying traps based on the information he acquires and outwitting his targets. He can transform into a Styracosaurus and perform the Head Punch attack, which possesses homing capabilities.

 Hydra - Hydra is an overly friendly Predacon who desires companionship and Magmatron's approval. Due to being stationed in a remote Predacon outpost for an extended period of time however, he befriended a maid droid and became overprotective of it. He can transform into a Pteranodon and wields the Wing Shot. Hydra is a redeco of the Beast Wars I mold that was used for Terrorsaur and Lazorbeak.

 Crazybolt - Crazybolt is a duplicitous Predacon escapologist who has a tendency to ramble. He can transform into a frill-necked lizard and wields a rifle capable of destroying starships. Crazybolt is a redeco of Iguanus from Beast Wars I.

 Bazooka - Bazooka is a serious, single-minded, and honorable Predacon who can transform into an Ankylosaurus and perform the Gigaton Stamp attack.

 Hardhead - Hardhead is a simple-minded yet tough Predacon warrior who can transform into a Pachycephalosaurus and wields the Pilesaber blade. He is a major redeco of the Beast Wars I mold used for Dinobot and Grimlock with a dome added to its head.

Unicron
Unicron is a disembodied cosmic entity who seeks to restore his body via his lifeforce, Angolmois Energy. Possessing the body of dead Predacon commander Galvatron, Unicron tasks the chimeric Blendtrons with gathering the Angolmois Capsules so he can turn Cybertron into a new body for himself. Despite nearly succeeding, Unicron is foiled by Big Convoy and Lio Convoy.

Blendtrons
The Blendtrons are Transformers who serve their creator Unicron and sport hybrid beast modes. Each of the Blendtrons are redecos of characters from the Beast Wars Fuzors toyline:

 Drancron - Drancron is a Blendtron who can transform into a lizard/dragonfly hybrid and wields the Drancutter, Clap Missiles, and Lizard Claws. He is a redeco of Sky Shadow.

 Elphorpha - Elphorca is a brutal Blendtron who can transform into an orca/elephant hybrid, possesses enhanced strength, acid production, the ability to stick to ceilings, and wields the Killer Tusks and Killer Shooter. He is a redeco of Torca.

 Ratorarta - Ratorrata is a cruel and vicious Blendtron who can transform into a lionfish/hornet hybrid and wields the Poison Arrow, the Dust Hornet, and the Lato Thrasher. He is a redeco of Injector.

Toy line
Beast Wars Neo's toy line contains exclusive figures available only in Japan, some of which later became available to other fans via the Hasbro online store or were available in later series, sometimes repainted and remolded. The Transformers: Universe release of Nemesis Prime was Hasbro's repaint of Big Convoy and was released in Australia as exclusive item, in addition to being a Target exclusive in the United States. The figure was later repainted again for Ultra Mammoth, a Transformers Collectors Club exclusive figure.      Magmatron also ended up as a Target exclusive, while various other figures from the line were introduced in the United States as repaints for various lines.

Theme Songs
Opening

Lyricist: Yoshiaki Ochi / Composer: Yoshiaki Ochi / Arranger: Yoshiaki Ochi / Singers: M.C.R.

Ending

Lyricist: Hitomi Yuki / Composer: Hitomi Yuki / Arranger: Hitomi Yuki / Singers: Hitomi Yuki

Insert Song
"DA DA DA"
Lyricist: Yoshiaki Ochi / Composer: Yoshiaki Ochi / Arranger: Yoshiaki Ochi / Singers: M.C.R.

Episodes

Chapters

Notes

References

External links

Official Ashi Productions website 
Official NAS website  
TV Tokyo listing 
Official Ashi Productions website 

1999 anime television series debuts
1999 manga
1999 Japanese television series debuts
1999 Japanese television series endings
Japanese children's animated action television series
Japanese children's animated space adventure television series
Japanese children's animated science fantasy television series
Japanese children's animated superhero television series
Japanese television series based on American television series
Post-apocalyptic anime and manga
Television shows set in the United States
Takara Tomy franchises
Shōnen manga
Super robot anime and manga
Superheroes in anime and manga
Transformers (franchise) animated television series
Transformers (toy line)
TV Tokyo original programming
Ashi Productions